Dr. Sharon Nazarian is an Iranian-born American social activist, academic and philanthropist. She is currently the Senior Vice President, International Affairs for the Anti-Defamation League.

Early life
Dr. Sharon Nazarian was born in Tehran, Iran. Her father, Younes Nazarian, was a businessman, philanthropist, and an early investor in the satellite technology company Qualcomm. Her mother, Soraya Nazarian, is a sculptor. She has two brothers, Sam Nazarian, David Nazarian, and a sister, Shulamit Nazarian. During the Iranian Revolution of 1979, she immigrated to the United States, settling in Beverly Hills, California with her parents and siblings.

She graduated from the University of Southern California (USC), where she received a Bachelor of Arts degree in Journalism and International Relations. She then received a master's degree and a PhD in political science from USC.

Career
In 2017, Dr. Nazarian joined the executive team of the Anti-Defamation League (ADL) as Senior Vice President for International Affairs, taking the responsibility of fighting Antisemitism and racial hatred around the globe, including overseeing ADL's Israel office.

In September 2019, Nazarian testified before a joint House committee hearing on the Internationalization of the Global White Supremacy Movement.
In June 2019, Nazarian represented the Anti-Defamation League in Mexico City, Mexico where ADL and the Mexican Foreign Ministry signed an agreement to work together to protect people of Mexican heritage living in the United States who are victims of discrimination, bigotry, bullying, and hate crimes. 
In January 2020, Nazarian testified before the US Commission on International Religious Freedom regarding global efforts to counter Antisemitism.

Prior to Anti-Defamation League, Nazarian was active in three worlds: academia, philanthropy and foreign policy. She is the President of the Y&S Nazarian Family Foundation, with a regional office in Israel named the Ima Foundation. She is also the founder of the Y&S Nazarian Center for Israel Studies at the University of California, Los Angeles (UCLA). and chair of its advisory board. Sharon taught as an adjunct professor at UCLA in the Department of Political Science, is a member of the Council of Foreign Relations and sits on a myriad of foreign policy boards.

She is a major shareholder of Nazarian Enterprises and SBE Entertainment Group.

In 2021, Nazarian was considered for an ambassadorship position at the Office to Monitor and Combat Anti-Semitism in the Biden administration.

Philanthropy
Dr. Nazarian serves as the President of the Younes and Soraya Nazarian Family Foundation which is dedicated to the promotion of education as the most important catalyst for societal change. The Foundation supports educational causes in a broad spectrum of institutions: academic, public policy, and community-based social and artistic programs.
Nazarian also serves on the Board of Governors of the University of Haifa.

On May 6, 2013, Dr. Nazarian was the recipient of a Deborah Award from the Anti-Defamation League in a ceremony at the SLS Hotel Beverly Hills. In 2015, Dr. Nazarian was the recipient of the 2015 Israel Film Festival Humanitarian Award in Beverly Hills, CA. She was honored for her contribution to the Oscar-Nominated Israeli Film Baba Joon.

Personal life
Dr. Nazarian was married to Sharyar Baradaran, a periodontist, from 1990 to the early 2010s. She now resides in Los Angeles with her husband, Fernando Flint, and her three children.

References

Living people
People from Tehran
People from Beverly Hills, California
Iranian emigrants to the United States
USC Annenberg School for Communication and Journalism alumni
University of California, Los Angeles faculty
Philanthropists from California
Jewish American philanthropists
Iranian philanthropists
Iranian Jews
American Conservative Jews
Sharon
USC School of International Relations alumni
Year of birth missing (living people)
21st-century American Jews